The Straits Steamship Company was a shipping firm that operated steamships on Puget Sound and the Strait of Juan de Fuca

Formation
The company was formed on July 1, 1894, by Capt. James Morgan, L. B. Hastings, W.S. Mann, and A.L. Horn.

Operations
The company operated the steamships Willapa and Garland on the route from Seattle to Neah Bay, and the Evangel on the route Seattle – Port Townsend – Port Angeles – Dungeness – Victoria.  In the first decade of the 1900s the company provided service to Friday Harbor on San Juan Island.

The company also owned the steamship, SS Hong Chuen, which was sunk at the beginning of World War II.

Notes

References
 Newell, Gordon, R., ed. H.W. McCurdy Maritime History of the Pacific Northwest, Superior Publishing 1966.
 Vouri, Mike, Vouri, Julia, San Juan Historical Society, Friday Harbor, Arcadia Publishing (1909)  
 Wright, E.W., Lewis & Dryden's Marine history of the Pacific Northwest, Lewis & Dryden Printing Co., Portland, OR (1995)

Defunct shipping companies based in Washington (state)